Saint-Victor-de-Morestel (literally Saint-Victor of Morestel) is a commune in the Isère department in southeastern France.

Demographics

Between 1975 and 2007, the population more than doubled. On 1 January 2017, there were 1,092 inhabitants living on a total area of thirteen square kilometers with a population density of 83 inhabitants per square kilometer.

History 
Until 1789 the commune was a parish of Morestel.

Points of Interest 
 Haut-Rhône National Nature Reserve

Notable people 
 Émile_Trolliet (1856-1903), poet.

See also
 Communes of the Isère department

References

Communes of Isère
Isère communes articles needing translation from French Wikipedia